Crazy Creek is a stream in Beaver County, Utah, United States.

Some hold the stream was named for its irregular course, while others believe the odd behavior of a pioneer who settled on this creek caused its name to be selected.

See also
List of rivers of Utah

References

Rivers of Beaver County, Utah
Rivers of Utah